Romanaria is a genus of moths of the family Tortricidae.

Species
Romanaria chachapoyas Razowski & Wojtusiak, 2010
Romanaria cedrana Razowski & Wojtusiak, 2010
Romanaria leuca Razowski & Wojtusiak, 2009
Romanaria spasmaria Razowski & Wojtusiak, 2006

Etymology
The genus name Romanaria is derived from the first name Roman to commemorate late professor of zoology of the Jagiellonian University and father of describer Janusz Wojtusiak, Roman Wojtusiak.

See also
List of Tortricidae genera

References

 , 2006: Tortricidae (Lepidoptera) in the valley of Río Gualaceo, East Cordillera in Ecuador, with descriptions of new taxa. Acta Zoologica Cracoviensia 49B (1-2): 17–53. Full article:.
 , 2009: Tortricidae (Lepidoptera) from the mountains of Ecuador and remarks on their geographical distribution. Part IV. Eastern Cordillera. Acta Zoologica Cracoviensia 51B (1-2): 119–187. . Full article: .
 , 2010: Tortricidae (Lepidoptera) from Peru. Acta Zoologica Cracoviensia 53B (1-2): 73–159. . Full article: .

External links
Tortricid.net

Euliini
Tortricidae genera
Taxa named by Józef Razowski